Chrysocercops melastigmata is a moth of the family Gracillariidae. It is known from Pahang, Malaysia.

The wingspan is 4.7–5.7 mm.

The larvae feed on Hopea nutans. They mine the leaves of their host plant.

References

Chrysocercops
Moths described in 1992